The Ngaju people (also Ngaju Dayak or Dayak Ngaju or Biaju) are an indigenous ethnic group of Borneo from the Dayak group. In a census from 2000, when they were first listed as a separate ethnic group, they made up 18.02% of the population of Central Kalimantan province. In an earlier census from 1930, the Ngaju people were included in the Dayak people count. They speak the Ngaju language.

Sub-ethnic groups

Based on river stream regions, the Ngaju people are divided into:-
 Greater Batang Baiju - Greater Baiju River
 Lesser Batang Baiju - Lesser Baiju River

Based on language, the Ngaju people are divided into:-
 Dayak Ngaju (Ngaju Kapuas) people
 Dayak Kahayan (Ngaju Kahayan) people
 Dayak Katingan (Ngaju Katingan) people
 Dayak Mendawai people (Central Kalimantan)
 Dayak Bakumpai people (South Kalimantan)
 Dayak Meratus people (South Kalimantan)
 Dayak Mengkatip people (Central Kalimantan)
 Dayak Berangas people (South Kalimantan, which is said to be no longer identifiable and their language is no longer in existence as of 2010 due to assimilation into the mainstream Kuala Banjar people)
 Dayak Beraki (Bara-ki) people (no longer in existence)

Culture

Traditional folk songs
 Sinta Takalupe Lunuk
 Karungut, Kal-Teng Membangun
 Yang Mahakasih (religious song)

Food
 Kopu, fermented cassava root. Usually eaten by mixing with shredded coconut meat
 Karuang or Kalumpe by the Ma'anyan people, a pounded Cassava leaf salad mixed with eggplant, lemongrass, onion and garlic.
 Juhu Umbut Batang Undus, coconut sprout salad eaten with sambal and often served during thanksgiving or wedding ceremonies.

Notable Dayak Ngaju people
 King Maruhum, the fourth Muslim Banjar king.
 Nyai Undang, Kutah Baguh queen of Tanjung Pematang Sawang kingdom.
 Raden Labih, head of the Dayak Ngaju Sei Apui people.
 Nicodemus Djaija Negara, a Dayak Ngaju head district of Pulau Petak.
 Damang Batu, a Dayak Ngaju Tumbang Anoi Kahayan leader and chairman of Dayak Tumbang Anoi.
 Damang Anggen, a Dayak Ngaju leader and head district of Mendawai Katingan.
 Soera Djaja, a Dayak Ngaju head district from Kampung Rawi and a Central Kalimantan freedom fighter.
 Damang Pijar, head of the Dayak people
 Batur, a Dayak Bakumpai commander, Barito War veteran.
 Wangkang, a Dayak Bakumpai commander, Barito War veteran.
 Hausman Baboe, a prominent figure in the Central Kalimantan press and founder of the first daily Suara Dayak Indonesian newspaper.
 Tjilik Riwut, a National Hero of Indonesia, founder of Central Kalimantan, a writer, a Central Kalimantan freedom fighter and former governor of Central Kalimantan.
 Mahir Mahar, founder and business leader of Central Kalimantan.
 Agustin Teras Narang, a Central Kalimantan governor and president of the National Dayak Customary Council.

See also
 View of the tiger

References

External links
Ngaju people
Soft Minded Men

 
Ethnic groups in Indonesia
Dayak people